Taylor Gill Force is one of the highest waterfalls in the Lake District of England. It is situated in Seathwaite, Allerdale, near Seatoller in Cumbria.

References

Waterfalls of Cumbria